Ján Zachara (born 27 August 1928) is a former Czechoslovak boxer who won the gold medal in the featherweight division at the 1952 Summer Olympics in Helsinki. Zachara also competed in 1956, losing in a quarterfinal to Pentti Hämäläinen of Finland on points. He was born in Kubrá, a borough of Trenčín, present-day Slovakia.

Olympic results
Defeated Åke Wärnström (Sweden) 3-0
Defeated Su Bung-Nan (South Korea) 3-0
Defeated János Erdei (Hungary) 2-1
Defeated Leonard Leisching (South Africa) 2-1
Defeated Sergio Caprari (Italy) 2-1

References

External links
 Olympic DB

1928 births
Living people
Sportspeople from Trenčín
Czechoslovak male boxers
Featherweight boxers
Boxers at the 1952 Summer Olympics
Boxers at the 1956 Summer Olympics
Olympic boxers of Czechoslovakia
Olympic gold medalists for Czechoslovakia
Olympic medalists in boxing
Slovak male boxers
Medalists at the 1952 Summer Olympics